Transgender Victoria (TGV) is a voluntary organisation for transgender people, their partners, families, and non-binary individuals. It promotes equity, and health and community services for transgender people in Victoria, Australia. In December 2014, Transgender Victoria won the Community Organisation Award, from the Australian Human Rights Commission.

Origins and management 

Transgender Victoria was co-founded by Kayleen White and Sally Goldner, in the late 1990s. The current chair of TGV is Rochelle Pattison. Other board members include Margot Fink, Brenda Appleton, Son Vivienne, Michelle McNamara, Jess Mattar, Cathy Eccles, Mellem Rose.

Activism 

Transgender Victoria presents on transgender and gender diverse issues to universities and medical students, media organisations and many others. A "What makes an Ally" project in partnership with Ygender promotes acceptance of transgender and gender diverse people. TGV also provides peer support, in particular on anxiety and depression issues. TGV also provides LGBT and intersex cultural competency training in aged care.

TGV works on advocacy issues in partnership with many other organizations, including on anti-discrimination protections. On 25 June 2013, the Commonwealth Sex Discrimination Amendment (Sexual Orientation, Gender Identity and Intersex Status) Act passed following collaborative advocacy work, and with cross-party support. It became law on 1 August 2013.

Awards and recognition 

Transgender Victoria received the Australian Human Rights Commission's 2014 "Community Award - Organisation" in December 2014. TGV was shortlisted "for its dedication to achieving justice, equity and quality health and community services for transgender people, their partners, families and friends".

Affiliations 

TGV is a member of LGBTIQ+ Health Australia.

See also
 Transgender rights in Australia
 Georgie Stone

References

External links 

Transgender Victoria on Facebook

Health charities in Australia
Medical and health organisations based in Victoria (Australia)
LGBT health organizations
LGBT history in Australia
LGBT organisations in Australia
Transgender organizations